The Armenian Genocide, which took place during World War I, resulted in the death of an estimated 1.5 million Armenians in the Ottoman Empire. Many Armenians were forcibly deported and subjected to brutal conditions, including starvation, forced labor, and mass killings. During the genocide, many documentations occur of instances where rescue attempts were made to save Armenians. Despite efforts, millions were still killed.

By country

France 

In 1915, as the genocide was underway, French naval ships were sent to the Ottoman Empire to evacuate French nationals and any other foreigners who were at risk. These ships also offered assistance to Armenian refugees who were attempting to escape the violence.

Lebanon 
Lebanon played a significant role in the rescue of Armenian Genocide survivors, particularly in providing a safe haven for refugees and assisting with their resettlement and integration.

References

Armenian genocide
Ottoman Empire